Tinkisso Falls is a waterfall on the Tinkisso River located near Dabola in central Guinea. The flow is highest during the rainy season, when the river flows close to ten times as strongly as in the dry season.

See also 
 List of waterfalls

References 

Waterfalls of Guinea